The Zimnica is a river in south-western Poland. It is a 20 km long left tributary of the river Oder. It begins near the city of Lubin, and joins the Oder near Ścinawa.

Rivers of Poland
Rivers of Lower Silesian Voivodeship